Grote Prijs Marcel Kint is a cycling race held annually in Belgium (Zwevegem & Kortrijk). It is part of UCI Europe Tour in category 1.1.

Winners

References

Cycle races in Belgium
UCI Europe Tour races
Recurring sporting events established in 1930
1930 establishments in Belgium